Lord Randolph Churchill was a two-part biography written by Winston Churchill of his father, the Victorian politician Lord Randolph Churchill. It was first published in 1906.

Background
From 1903 until 1905, Churchill was engaged in writing Lord Randolph Churchill, a two-volume biography of his father which was published in 1906 and received much critical acclaim. However, filial devotion caused him to soften some of his father's less attractive aspects. Theodore Roosevelt, who had known Lord Randolph, reviewed the book as "a clever, tactful and rather cheap and vulgar life of that clever, tactful and rather cheap and vulgar egotist". Some historians suggest Churchill used the book in part to vindicate his own career and in particular to justify crossing the floor.

References

Sources

External links
Lord Randolph Churchill at Project Gutenberg

1906 non-fiction books
Books by Winston Churchill
English non-fiction literature
Biographies about politicians
Books written by prime ministers of the United Kingdom